Domasław  is a village in the administrative district of Gmina Kobierzyce, within Wrocław County, Lower Silesian Voivodeship, in south-western Poland.

The village has an approximate population of 729.

References

Domaslaw